The 2019 Open Harmonie mutuelle was a professional tennis tournament played on hard courts. It was the sixteenth edition of the tournament which was part of the 2019 ATP Challenger Tour. It took place in Saint-Brieuc, France between 25 and 31 March 2019.

Singles main-draw entrants

Seeds

 Rankings are as of 18 March 2019.

Other entrants
The following players received wildcards into the singles main draw:
  Evan Furness
  Hugo Grenier
  Manuel Guinard
  Matteo Martineau
  Alexandre Müller

The following player received entry into the singles main draw as an alternate:
  Pavel Kotov

The following players received entry into the singles main draw using their ITF World Tennis Ranking:
  Andrés Artuñedo
  Baptiste Crepatte
  Grégoire Jacq
  Roman Safiullin

The following players received entry from the qualifying draw:
  Aslan Karatsev
  Sergiy Stakhovsky

The following player received entry as a lucky loser:
  Jelle Sels

Champions

Singles

 Kamil Majchrzak def.  Maxime Janvier 6–3, 7–6(7–1).

Doubles

 Jonathan Erlich /  Fabrice Martin def.  Jonathan Eysseric /  Antonio Šančić 7–6(7–2), 7–6(7–2).

References

External links
Official Website

2019 ATP Challenger Tour
2019
2019 in French tennis
March 2019 sports events in France